Massachusetts elected its members November 6, 1826.  It required a majority for election, which was not met on the first vote in 3 districts requiring additional elections held March 5 and May 14, 1827.

See also 
 1827 Massachusetts's 1st congressional district special election
 1826 and 1827 United States House of Representatives elections
 List of United States representatives from Massachusetts

Notes 

United States House of Representatives elections in Massachusetts
Massachusetts
Massachusetts
United States House of Representatives
United States House of Representatives